Major Eric Ayshford Knight was a British Conservative Party politician. He served as an Conservative Party Member of Parliament for Kidderminster between 1910 and 1922.

Parliamentary career 
Knight first contested the Kidderminster seat in the January 1910 general election and won the seat. he then kept his seat until the 1922 election. in 1914, Knight campaigned for volunteer soldiers to get paid a soldiers salary.

References 

Conservative Party (UK) MPs for English constituencies
UK MPs 1918–1922